Soakibany is a town and commune in Madagascar. It belongs to the district of Midongy-Atsimo, which is a part of Atsimo-Atsinanana Region. There are 1251 inscribed voters in this commune.

To this commune belong also the villages of:

Amboangy
Anezandava est
Antaramiery
Bearaotra
Fasikendry
Mahasoa, Soakibany
Manatatoa Atsimo

References and notes 

Populated places in Atsimo-Atsinanana